Chile participated in the ninth Winter Paralympics in Turin, Italy. 

Chile entered two athletes in the following sports:

Alpine skiing: 2 male

Medalists

See also

2006 Winter Paralympics
Chile at the 2006 Winter Olympics

External links
Torino 2006 Paralympic Games
International Paralympic Committee

Nations at the 2006 Winter Paralympics
2006
Winter Paralympics